The 2006 Thomas & Uber Cups Preliminaries for Africa were held in Rose Hill, Mauritius, between 19 and 23 February 2006, and organised by Mauritius Badminton Association. South Africa was the defending champion in men's and women's team events. This tournament serves as qualification stage for African countries for the 2006 Thomas & Uber Cup. South Africa men's and women's team qualified to compete at the 2006 Thomas & Uber Cup held in Japan.

Medalists

Men's Team

Women's Team

References 

Africa Continental Team Badminton Championships
Badminton tournaments in Mauritius
Thomas & Uber Cups Preliminaries for Africa
Thomas & Uber Cups Preliminaries for Africa